Ozhalur Viswanatha Mudaliar Alagesan (6 September 1911 – 3 January 1992) was an Indian politician and freedom fighter from the Indian state of Tamil Nadu. He served as a Member of parliament, Lok Sabha from 1952 to 1957, 1962 to 1967 and from 1971 to 1980.

Politics
Alagesan was a member of the Constituent Assembly and Provisional Parliament from 1946 to 1951. In 1952, he was elected Member of Parliament from Chingleput. He lost the elections in 1957 but was re-elected in 1962. 
He supported the anti Hindi agitation and opposed the Central Government's language policy. On 11 February 1965, he and C.Subramaniam two union ministers from Madras state, resigned protesting the Union government's language policy. After Shastri's assurances to Tamils that English would continue to be used for centre-state and intrastate communications and that the All India Civil Services examination would continue to be conducted in English, he and C.Subramaniam withdrew their resignations. 
He also served as a Member of Parliament from Tiruthani from 1971 to 1977 and Arakkonam from 1977 to 1980.

As an active parliamentarian, he left an indelible imprint on the proceedings of the House. He had also served effectively on various Committees of the House. 
A versatile personality. he was a reputed social reformer and a distinguished administrator. He relentlessly worked for the removal of social evils like untouchability and prohibition.

Alagesan served as India's Ambassador to Ethiopia from 1968 to 1971.

Indian Independence Movement
He took active part in the Indian Independence movement. He discontinued studies in 1930 to join Salt Satyagraha movement under the leadership of Mahatma Gandhi and suffered imprisonment; participated in (i) Civil Disobedience movement; (ii) Individual Satyagraha movement; (iii) Quit India movement; and was imprisoned for more than three years.

Development of TamilNadu (earlier Madras) State
As Central Minister and member of Parliament, he was instrumental in getting the Madras Refineries, the Kalpakkam Nuclear Power Plant and, along with Dewan Bahadur Gopalaswamy Iyengar, the Integral Coach Factory, set up in Tamil Nadu. His contributions were acknowledged in a multi party function held to celebrate his centenary in 2011.

Contribution to education
He was Founder-President of Bhaktavatsalam Educational Trust registered in 1958, which runs the following institutions; 
(i) Bhaktavalsalam Shastiabda Purthi High School, Athur; 
(ii) Bhaktavatsalam Polytechnic, Kancheepuram, 
(iii) Sarojini Varadappan Girls High School, Poonamalle, all in Chengalpatttu District; 
(iv) Brindavan Public School, Coonoor, Nilgiri District; and 
(v) a branch of the above school at Athur.

Writings
Alagesan translated Jawaharlal Nehru 's Glimpses of World History into Tamil which was published as உலக சரித்திரம்(பாகம்1,2) by Alaigal Publishers அலைகள் வெளியீட்டகம்.

Death
Alagesan died on 3 January 1992 at the age of 81.

Notes

References
 

1911 births
1992 deaths
Lok Sabha members from Tamil Nadu
Indian National Congress politicians from Tamil Nadu
India MPs 1952–1957
India MPs 1962–1967
India MPs 1971–1977
People from Kanchipuram district
India MPs 1977–1979
Prisoners and detainees of British India